Íñigo López de Mendoza y Mendoza (b. 1536 - d. 1601) was the 5th Duke of the Infantado from 1566 until his death in 1601.

He was the son of Diego Hurtado De Mendoza Y Aragón, who predeceased his father Íñigo López de Mendoza, 4th Duke of the Infantado.

Biography 

A favorite of Philip II of Spain, Íñigo accompanied the king to England for his marriage with Mary Tudor in 1556.  As a big patron of the art's, and due to his perpetual, but friendly competition with the king, Íñigo boasted that his palace was every bit as splendid as El Escorial, hiring some of the same painters to paint its walls and ceilings.  The remodeling of the palace was carried out by Acacio de Orejón on the orders of Íñigo.

Íñigo later hosted the king's marriage to Elisabeth of Valois at his palace in Guadalajara in 1560.

Descendants 

In 1552 he married Luisa Enriquez de Cabrera, and together they had 3 daughters.

He married his eldest daughter and successor, Ana de Mendoza y Enríquez de Cabrera (1554-1633) with his brother, Rodrigo de Mendoza so as to avoid problems over succession of the Dukedom.

His two other daughters 
Isabel (died 1593) married Lorenzo Suárez de Figueroa, 2nd Duke of Feria  (1559 - 1607)  
Mencía (died 1619) married Antonio Álvarez de Toledo, 5th Duke of Alba (1568 - 1639)

References 

Los Mendoza
 The information on this page was mostly translated from its Spanish equivalent.

1536 births
1601 deaths
5
Inigo